This list of historical markers installed by the National Historical Commission of the Philippines (NHCP) in the Bicol Region (Region V) is an annotated list of people, places, or events in the region that have been commemorated by cast-iron plaques issued by the said commission. The plaques themselves are permanent signs installed in publicly visible locations on buildings, monuments, or in special locations.

While many Cultural Properties have historical markers installed, not all places marked with historical markers are designated into one of the particular categories of Cultural Properties.

This article lists seventy-four (74) markers from the Bicol Region.

Albay
This article lists twenty (20) markers from the Province of Albay.

Camarines Norte
This article lists eleven (11) markers from the Province of Camarines Norte.

Camarines Sur
This article lists thirty-four (34) markers from the Province of Camarines Sur.

Catanduanes
This article lists one (2) marker from the Province of Catanduanes.

Masbate 
This article lists no markers from the Province of Masbate.

Sorsogon
This article lists eight (8) markers from the Province of Sorsogon.

See also
List of Cultural Properties of the Philippines in the Bicol Region

References

Footnotes

Bibliography 

A list of sites and structures with historical markers, as of 16 January 2012
A list of institutions with historical markers, as of 16 January 2012

External links
A list of sites and structures with historical markers, as of 16 January 2012
A list of institutions with historical markers, as of 16 January 2012
National Registry of Historic Sites and Structures in the Philippines
Policies on the Installation of Historical Markers

Bicol
Bicol Region